The Winner is fiction novel by American author David Baldacci. The book was initially published on January 1, 1998 by Grand Central Publishing.

Plot
The novel tells the story of LuAnn Tyler, a destitute mother living in a trailer park, who meets with Jackson, a man running a massive lottery scam from inside the National Lottery. He offers her a chance to win the lottery, which she initially refuses until she finds herself falsely accused of murder and needing to run for her life with her young daughter in tow. He rigs the lottery so that she wins $100,000,000, on the condition that she leaves the United States and never returns. When she secretly returns ten years later, Jackson comes to punish her for disobeying him, the FBI is searching for her in connection with the lottery scam, and her only help comes from the mysterious Matthew Riggs.

References

External links
 

Novels by David Baldacci
1998 American novels
American thriller novels
Works about lotteries
Grand Central Publishing books